Pope John Paul II (born Karol Józef Wojtyła) reigned as Pope of the Catholic Church (1978–2005).

Pope John Paul II may also refer to:
Pope John Paul II (film), a 1984 film
Pope John Paul II (miniseries), a 2005 television miniseries
Juan Pablo II Bridge, a bridge in Chile
John Paul II Bridge, Puławy, a bridge in Poland
Pope John Paul II Stadium or Marshal Józef Piłsudski Stadium
John Paul II Catholic University of Lublin
Pope John Paul II High School (Washington), a high school in Washington State

See also

John Paul (disambiguation)
John Paul II (disambiguation)
Karol Wojtyla (disambiguation)
Pope John (disambiguation)
Pope John Paul (disambiguation)
Pope John Paul I
Pope John Paul II High School (disambiguation)
Pope Paul (disambiguation)
Saint John Paul II (disambiguation)